Radient Technologies Inc. is a Canadian licensed commercial manufacturer of cannabis derivatives and products, headquartered in Edmonton. It trades on the Toronto Venture Exchange and OTCQX as RTI and RDDTF.

History
Radient was started by Dr. Steven Splinter in 1994. His work in technical assessment and the development of process technologies led him to the position of Director of Chemical & Environmental Processes at BC Research. His work in microwave-assisted natural product extraction, purification and isolation, was eventually spun off in 2001 as Radient Technologies in a joint venture with Environment Canada.

The company says that its patented extraction technology Microwave Assisted Processing (MAP) extracts a higher amount of the desired cannabinoids from the leaf,  and that that the process allows it to heat the cannabis biomass with more precision, using less solvent than the methods being used by other companies, with higher throughput and improved economies of scale.

Frank Ferlaino, former CEO of L’Oreal Canada and corporate credit officer for the Bank of Nova Scotia, joined the company's board of directors, of which he became chairman of in 2017.

Denis Taschuk was brought onto the board and was CEO from 2010 to 2020, overseeing the company's listing on the TSX Venture Exchange and the scaling up of the extraction facilities, which was able to process up to 200 kg of biomass per hour, or 5 metric tons a day at its Edmonton facility in 2018.

Jan Petzel, the founder of Eldon Capital, joined in 2016. He was previously managing director of the Merchant Banking Division at Goldman Sachs International, and was a board member of Cognis GmbH.  Petzel was soon after appointed CFO, and then was temporarily the CEO before stepping down to be replaced by current CEO Harry Kaura. During this time, RTI made significant reductions in operating expenses and expanded its product development, with 55 skus in market in October 2021, expanding by the spring of 2022, including the production of packages of pre-rolls at a projected scale of at least 10 million cannabis pre-roll units (1 million packages) per month.

In 2017 Aurora Cannabis made an investment of $6.2 million in the company.

The company earned $2.4 million in sales in 2021.

References

External links

Canadian companies established in 2001
Cannabis companies of Canada
Cannabis in Alberta
Companies listed on the TSX Venture Exchange
Medicinal use of cannabis organizations